This is a list of feminist poets. Historically, literature has been a male-dominated sphere, and any poetry written by a woman could be seen as feminist. Often, feminist poetry refers to that which was composed after the 1960s and the second-wave of the feminist movement. This list focuses on poets who take explicitly feminist approaches to their poetry.

A–D
Kathy Acker (1947–1997), American experimental novelist, punk poet, playwright and essayist
Maya Angelou (1928–2014), American author and poet
Elvia Ardalani (born 1963), Mexican poet, writer and storyteller
Margaret Atwood (born 1939), Canadian poet, novelist and critic
Addie L. Ballou (1837–1916), American poet and suffragist 
Djuna Barnes (1892–1982), American modernist lesbian writer
Aphra Behn (1640–1689), dramatist of the English Restoration and among first English professional female writers
Elizabeth Bishop (1911–1979), American poet and short-story writer
Eavan Boland (1944–2020), Irish poet
Sophia Elisabet Brenner (1659–1730), Swedish writer, poet, feminist and salon hostess
Olga Broumas (born 1949), Greek poet living in the United States
Lucille Clifton (1936–2010), American writer and educator
Mary Collier (c. 1688–1762), English poet
Jeni Couzyn (born 1942), Canadian poet and anthologist of South African extraction
H.D. (Hilda Doolittle) (1886–1961), American poet, novelist and memoirist known for Imagist poetry
Emily Dickinson (1830–1886), American poet
Diane Di Prima (1934–2020), American poet
Carol Ann Duffy (born 1955), Scottish poet and playwright; first female and first Scottish Poet Laureate of the United Kingdom
Rachel Blau DuPlessis (born 1941), American poet and essayist known as a feminist critic and scholar

E–K
Muzi Epifani (1935–1984), Italian writer and poet
Fehmida Riaz (1946–2018), Urdu writer, poet, and feminist of Pakistan
Mary Eliza Fullerton (1868–1946), Australian feminist poet, short story writer, journalist and novelist
Alice Fulton (born 1952), American author, poet
Frances Dana Barker Gage (1808–1884), American writer, poet, reformer, feminist and abolitionist
Charlotte Perkins Gilman (1860–1935), American sociologist, author, poet and lecturer for social reform
Hedwig Gorski (born 1949), American poet, author, artist, dramatist, and scholar 
Judy Grahn (born 1940), American feminist, lesbian poet
Barbara Guest (1920–2006), American poet, author
Marilyn Hacker (born 1942), American poet, translator and critic
Judith Hall (born 1951), American poet, literary editor, educational writer, essayist, illustrator and educator
Jane Eaton Hamilton (born 1954), Canadian poet, fiction writer, photographer, visual artist
Gwen Harwood (1920–1995), Australian poet and librettist
Allison Hedge Coke (born 1958), American/Canadian poet
Lyn Hejinian (born 1941), American poet, essayist, translator and publisher
Dorothy Hewett (1923–2002), Australian feminist poet, novelist, librettist and playwright
Susan Howe (born 1937), American poet, scholar, essayist and critic; closely associated with the Language poets
Kiyémis (born 1993), French Afro-feminist and poet
Maryam Jafari Azarmani (born 1977), Iranian poet, Sonneteer, essayist, literary critic, translator
Kishwar Naheed (born 1940), Urdu poet from Pakistan known for her pioneering feminist poetry
Carolyn Kizer (1925–2014), Pulitzer Prize-winning American poet; noted for her feminist poetry
Terri L. Jewell (1954–1995), author, poet and Black lesbian activist

L–R
Sue Lenier (born 1957), English poet and playwright
Anna Maria Lenngren (1754–1817), Swedish writer, poet, feminist, translator and salonnière
Denise Levertov (1923–1997), British-born American poet
Patricia Lockwood (born 1982), American poet and essayist
Audre Lorde (1934–1992), Caribbean-American writer, poet and activist
Mina Loy (1882–1966), artist, poet, playwright and novelist, Futurist
Chris Mansell (born 1953), Australian poet and publisher
Edna St. Vincent Millay (1892–1950), American lyrical poet, playwright and feminist
Gabriela Mistral (Lucila Godoy Alcayaga) (1889–1957), Chilean poet, educator and feminist; first Latin American to win Nobel Prize in Literature
Marianne Moore (1887–1972), American Modernist poet and writer
Barbara Mor (1936–2015), American feminist of the Goddess movement
Robin Morgan (born 1941), American poet, author, political theorist and activist
Eileen Myles (born 1949) American poet and writer, Guggenheim Fellowship recipient and LGBT activist
Lorine Niedecker (1903–1970), American poet; only woman associated with Objectivist poets
Hedvig Charlotta Nordenflycht (1718–1763), Swedish poet, feminist and salon hostess
Alice Notley (born 1945), American poet and feminist
Alicia Ostriker (born 1937), American poet and scholar writing Jewish feminist poetry
Grace Paley (1922–2007), American-Jewish short story writer, poet, and political activist
Sylvia Pankhurst (1882–1960), English suffragist, poet
Dorothy Parker (1893–1967), American poet, short story writer, critic and satirist
Parveen Shakir (1952–1994), Urdu poet, teacher and a civil servant in Pakistan
Sylvia Plath (1932–1963), American poet, novelist and short story writer
Katha Pollitt (born 1949), American feminist poet, essayist and critic
Qiu Jin (1875–1907), Chinese revolutionary, feminist and writer
Rita Mae Reese (living), American poet, fiction writer, and publisher
Adrienne Rich (1929–2012), American poet, essayist and feminist
Dorothy Richardson (1873–1957), English novelist, poet, essayist and short story writer
Lola Ridge (1873–1941), anarchist poet and editor of avant-garde, feminist, and Marxist publications
Ethel Rolt-Wheeler (1869–1958), English poet, author and journalist
Christina Rossetti (1830–1894), English writer of romantic, devotional and children's poems
Muriel Rukeyser (1913–1980), American poet and political activist

S–Z
Nandini Sahu (born 1973), Indian poet writing in English
Sonia Sanchez (born 1934), African-American poet often associated with Black Arts Movement
Sappho (fl. 6th century BCE), Ancient Greek poet; one of the nine lyric poets
Henriette Sauret (1890-1976), French feminist pacifist poet, writer, journalist
Anne Sexton (1928–1974), American poet known for personal, confessional verse
Jo Shapcott (born 1953), English poet, editor and lecturer
Elena Shirman (1908–1942), Russian poet
Edith Sitwell (1887–1964), British poet and critic, eldest of three literary Sitwells
Stevie Smith (1902–1971), English poet and novelist
Gertrude Stein (1874–1946), American writer, poet and art collector who spent most of life in France
Alfonsina Storni (1892–1938), Swiss-Argentine poet
Lynn Strongin (born 1939), American poet
May Swenson (1913–1989), American poet and playwright
Sara Teasdale (1884–1933), American lyrical poet
Ann Townsend (born 1962) American poet and essayist
Marina Tsvetaeva (1892–1941), Russian and Soviet poet
Anne Waldman (born 1945), American poet
Rosmarie Waldrop (born 1935), American poet, translator and publisher
Alice Walker (born 1944), American author, poet, and activist
Phyllis Webb (1927–2021), Canadian poet and radio broadcaster
Nellie Wong (born 1934), Chinese-American feminist poet
Merle Woo (born 1941), Asian-American teacher, poet and activist
Judith Wright (1915–2000), Australian poet, environmentalist and campaigner for Aboriginal land rights
Elinor Wylie (1885–1928), American poet and novelist
Halima Xudoyberdiyeva (1947–2018), Uzbek poet; People's Poet of Uzbekistan
Mitsuye Yamada (born 1923), Japanese-American activist, feminist, essayist, poet, story writer, editor, and professor

References

Feminist poets
Feminist poets
Poets
Poets